Mar Shimun XIII Dinkha was Patriarch of the Chaldean Catholic Church carrying the title Patriarch of Babylon between 1662 and 1692 in communion with Rome and residing in Khosrau-Abad near Salmas. He was the last in the hereditary Shimun line of Patriarchs in the Chaldean Catholic Church and, like his predecessors Shimun X Eliyah (1600–1638), Shimun XI Eshuyow (1638–1656) and Shimun XII Yoalaha (1656–1662), was allegedly not officially recognized by Rome since the Catholic church does not approve of hereditary patriarchates.

In 1692, Patriarch Shimun XIII moved the seat of his patriarchate to Qochanis (modern-day Konak, Hakkari), broke communion with Rome and became Patriarch of the Assyrian Church of the East, continuing the Shimun hereditary line of Patriarchs in the Assyrian church instead, a tradition that continued until the death of Patriarch Shimun XXI Eshai in 1975.

Patriarch Shimun Dinkha died around 1700 AD and was succeeded in the Assyrian Church of the East by Shemʿon XIV Shlemon.

See also
List of Chaldean Catholic patriarchs of Babylon
List of patriarchs of the Church of the East
List of patriarchs of the Assyrian Church of the East

Chaldean Catholic Patriarchs of Babylon
17th-century bishops of the Church of the East
17th-century Eastern Catholic archbishops
18th-century bishops of the Church of the East
18th-century archbishops
Assyrians from the Ottoman Empire
Bishops in the Ottoman Empire
17th-century people from the Ottoman Empire
18th-century people from the Ottoman Empire
17th-century people of Safavid Iran
Patriarchs of the Church of the East